Gerardo Rodríguez may refer to:

Gerardo Matos Rodríguez, Uruguayan musician, composer and journalist
Carlos Gerardo Rodríguez, Mexican football midfielder
Gerardo Rodríguez (water polo), played Water polo at the 1980 Summer Olympics